El Echbili Mosque, is a Tunisian mosque located in the medina of Tunis.

Location
The mosque can be found in the intersection between the Bach Hamba Street and the Tresor Street, in front of souk El Blat.

Description
The mosque was built in the 10th century.
It has a large facade with three doors.
The minaret was added in the 14th century

References 

Mosques in Tunis
19th-century mosques